Haji Ali ben Khrelil was Dey of the Deylik of Algiers from 1809 - 1815.

He was known as a strict, but fiercely independent ruler. Throughout his reign, he waged war on Tunisia and various European and American countries. He was an avid sponsor of Barbary piracy, and he was also the one to reinvite Raïs Hamidou into the country. He deliberately attacked shipments from various Western countries, and even from Islamic countries like Morocco and the Ottoman Empire. The relationship between Algeria and the Ottoman Empire during his rule were at an all-time low, and the Ottoman government lodged several complaints, and firmans against him, all of which he simply ignored.

References 

1815 deaths
Deys of Algiers
Year of birth missing